The Principles of the Treaty of Waitangi (in Māori: ngā mātāpono o te tiriti), in New Zealand law and politics, are a set of principles derived from, and interpreting, the Treaty of Waitangi. They are partly an attempt to reconcile the different te reo Māori and English language versions of the Treaty, and allow the application of the Treaty to a contemporary context.

The principles of the Treaty are often mentioned in contemporary New Zealand politics.

Need for Treaty principles
The Treaty is not regarded as law because it is a treaty, not a law. Notwithstanding that, "the English and Māori versions are not exactly the same", and "it focuses on the issues relevant at the time it was signed." As well as this, New Zealand law affirms the common law doctrine that "any rights purporting to be conferred by a treaty of cession cannot be enforced in the courts, except in so far as they have been incorporated in the municipal law".

Origins of the principles
The principles originate from a case brought in the High Court by the New Zealand Māori Council (New Zealand Maori Council v Attorney-General) in 1987. There was great concern at that time about the ongoing restructuring of the New Zealand economy by the then Fourth Labour Government, specifically the transfer of assets from former Government departments to State-owned enterprises. Because the state-owned enterprises were essentially private firms owned by the government, there was an argument that they would prevent assets which had been given by Māori for use by the state from being returned to Māori by the Waitangi Tribunal and through Treaty settlements. The Māori Council sought enforcement of section 9 of the State-Owned Enterprises Act 1986 which reads: "Nothing in this Act shall permit the Crown to act in a manner that is inconsistent with the principles of the Treaty of Waitangi".

The Court of Appeal, in a judgement of its then President Sir Robin Cooke, decided upon the following Treaty principles:
The acquisition of sovereignty in exchange for the protection of rangatiratanga.
The Treaty established a partnership and imposed on the partners the duty to act reasonably and in good faith.
The freedom of the Crown to govern.
The Crown's duty of active protection.
The duty of the Crown to remedy past breaches.
Māori to retain rangatiratanga over their resources and taonga and have all citizenship privileges.
Duty to consult.

Fourth Labour Government's principles
In 1989, the Fourth Labour Government adopted the "Principles for Crown Action on the Treaty of Waitangi". Therese Crocker has argued that Labour's publication of the principles "comprised one of a number of Crown responses to what is generally known as the 'Maori Renaissance'." Prime Minister David Lange, in an introduction to the document said of the principles that:

The principles in the 1989 publication are as follow:

This principle describes the balance between articles 1 and 2: the exchange of sovereignty by the Māori people for the protection of the Crown. It was emphasised in the context of this principle that "the Government has the right to govern and make laws".

The Government also recognised the Court of Appeal's description of active protection, but identified the key concept of this principle as a right for iwi to organise as iwi and, under the law, to control the resources they own.

The Principles in legislation

The Treaty of Waitangi principles have impacted and enacted various legislation in particular issues in regards to property or land and many other social, legal and political aspects that affected one or more of the principles. The principles therefore have strong influence on not only the decision making of governments but also on laws.

The following legislation were established due to a significant amount of influence by the Treaty of Waitangi principles and are only a few of many applications of principles within laws:

 Fisheries Act 1983
 Environment Act 1986
 State Owned Enterprises Act 1986
 Conservation Act 1987
 Resource Management Act 1991
 Crown Minerals Act 1991
 Marine and Coastal Area (Takutai Moana) Act 2011

Opposition to the principles

Principles Deletion Bill, 2005
The "Principles of the Treaty of Waitangi Deletion Bill" was introduced to the New Zealand Parliament in 2005 as a private member's bill by New Zealand First MP Doug Woolerton. "This bill eliminates all references to the expressions "the principles of the Treaty", "the principles of the Treaty of Waitangi" and the "Treaty of Waitangi and its principles" from all New Zealand Statutes including all preambles, interpretations, schedules, regulations and other provisos included in or arising from each and every such Statute".

At the first reading of the Bill, New Zealand First leader Winston Peters said:

The bill failed to pass its second reading in November 2007.

In a legal analysis of the bill for Chapman Tripp, David Cochrane argued that without the principles it would probably be an "impossible task" for the Waitangi Tribunal to carry out its role.

Notes

References

External links
Principles of the Treaty article at Te Ara

Treaty of Waitangi
Law of New Zealand